Sybra ponapensis is a species of beetle in the family Cerambycidae. It was described by Blair in 1942.

References

ponapensis
Beetles described in 1942